Etxeberria (modern Basque spelling) is a Basque language placename and surname from the Basque Country in Spain and France, meaning 'the new house'. It shows one meaningful variant, Etxeberri (no Basque article –a, 'the'), and a number of later spelling variants produced in Spanish and other languages. Etxebarri(a) is a western Basque dialectal variant, with the same etymology. Etxarri (Echarri) is attested as stemming from Etxaberri.

The original surname is often associated with the construction of new farms (baserri) after the introduction of New World crops like maize and potatoes. In many Basque areas, the surname Etxeberri(a) was formerly associated to the naturalized Roma people, while in the French Basque Country it was sometimes translated to Gascon Casenave/Cazenave.

Spellings and dialectal distribution
Etxebarri(a) variants hail from Biscay, most of northern Álava, and western Gipuzkoa, while the Etxeberri(a) (Echeberri(a), Echeberry(a)) are based in the eastern tip of Álava, rest of Gipuzkoa, Navarre, and French Basque Country. The termination –a stands for the article, 'the', sometimes missing. As for the spellings, the v/b alternation doesn't reflect any allophones, but different writing styles and conventions. The Etcheverry or Echeverri type of spelling typically hails from the French Basque Country, while the Echeverría type shows a Spanish spelling. However, adaptations and distortions of original forms taking place during emigration to America added to the confusion. Etxeberri(a) denotes influence of the spelling rules developed by Sabino Arana for the Basque language as of the late 19th century.

Some cognate forms resulting from dialectal distribution and adaptation to other languages are:

 Etchevery, Etcheverry, Echeverri, Echeverría, Echeberria, Cheberri, Cheberry, Etxeberry
 Etxebarri, Etxebarria, Echebarría, Echevarría, Chávarri, Chavarria, Hechavarria, Echavarria
 Etxeber, Echeber
 Xavier, Xabier
 Etxeberre, Echeberre
 Txiberri, Chiberri, Iberri
 Etxeberrieta, Etxebarrieta
 Hechavarría

Origin
The Biscayne branch of the Echevarría family is thought to have originated in the town of Dima, it grew to the neighbouring town of Zeanuri, and eventually spread to the nearby city of Vitoria-Gasteiz.  However, it is too widespread a place-name to pinpoint just one location.  Another branch of Echebarria hails from Durango and Zaldibar (Biscay).

An Echeberria branch originated in Sorabilla (Andoain) and extended its roots to many other towns across Gipuzkoa. Another one is from Amezketa, stretching out its roots to a large number of villages and towns in the province. It further expanded to Santander, and on to Seville and Chile. Another branch originated in different spots of Baztan, Baigorri, and Leitza (northern Navarre), expanding later to the south of Navarre: Pamplona, Estella-Lizarra, Tudela, etc.

The Echeberri form hails from Ezkio, Oñati, Hondarribia, Hendaye (the branch expanded out to Colombia), Oiartzun, Donostia, etc. "Echeberry" is typically from the town of Tolosa (Gipuzkoa), attested in 1346.

Notable people
 Joseba Etxeberria (b. 1977), football player for Athletic Bilbao and Spain
 Imanol Etxeberria (b. 1973), football player for Athletic Bilbao
 Luis Echeverría Álvarez (b. 1922), president of Mexico, 1970–76
 Esteban Echeverría (1805-1851), 19th century writer and political activist from Argentina
 Liza Echeverría (b. 1972), Mexican actress and model
 Sandra Echeverría (b. 1981), Mexican actress and singer
 Atanasio Echeverría y Godoy, 18th century Mexican botanical artist and naturalist 
 Francisco de Borja Echeverría (1848-1904), a Chilean Conservative Party deputy and diplomat
 Bernardino Echeverría Ruiz (1912-2000), a Roman Catholic Cardinal
 Rob Echeverria, former member of American rock band Biohazard
 Star Bonifacio Echeverria, Spanish manufacturer of small arms
 Banco Etcheverría
 Andrea Echeverri (born 1965), pop singer
 Juan Carlos Echeverry, opera singer
 Adeiny Hechavarria, American baseball player
 Ignacio Echevarría (b. 1960), a Spanish literary critic and editor
 Andy Etchebarren (b. 1943), American baseball player
 Sam Etcheverry (1930-2009), American and Canadian football player
Pedro Echevarria, Host/Producer, C-SPAN

Places
It is a widespread place-name across the whole Basque Country and showing similar Romanized variants in Aragon. It refers to baserris, neighbourhoods, villages, and towns:
 Etxeberri, Arakil, a village in Navarre, Spain

See also
 Javier (name)
 Echevarria (disambiguation)

Footnotes

References
Michelena, L. Apellidos vascos (5th edition), Txertoa: 1997.

External links
Echebarria surname in the Spanish-language.
Neighborhood in Segura, Gipuzkoa.
Farm in Arama, Gipuzkoa.
Farm in Hernialde, Gipuzkoa.
Neighborhood in Zegama, Gipuzkoa.
House in Arazuri, Olza, Navarre.
House in Erratzu, Baztan, Navarre.
 House in the Bildarritz quarter of Ayherre, census 1435

Basque-language surnames
Surnames